Events in the year 2022 in San Marino.

Incumbents 
 Captains Regent: 
 Nicola Selva, Luca Boschi (until 1 April)
 Oscar Mina, Paolo Rondelli (from 1 April to 1 October)
Maria Luisa Berti, Manuel Ciavatta (from 1 October)
 Secretary for Foreign and Political Affairs: Luca Beccari

Events

Deaths

See also 

 2022 in Europe
 City states

References 

 
2020s in San Marino
Years of the 21st century in San Marino
San Marino
San Marino